Those Lazy-Hazy-Crazy Days may refer to:
 Those Lazy-Hazy-Crazy Days of Summer (album), a 1963 album by Nat King Cole
 "Those Lazy-Hazy-Crazy Days of Summer", the title song of the Nat King Cole album
 "Those Lazy-Hazy-Crazy Days" (episode), an episode of the TV series Gilmore Girls